Aghavoher is small a townland in the civil parish of Tomregan, County Cavan, Ireland.

Geography
Aghavoher is bounded on the north by Cranaghan townland, on the west by Clifton, County Cavan, Mullynagolman and Carrigan townlands, on the south by Breandrum, Tullyhunco townland and on the east by Greaghrahan and Carn townlands. Its chief geographical features are Aghavoher Lough and the Rag River on its northern boundary and a small hill which rises to 306 feet above sea level. Aghavoher is traversed by the Kildallan road and Carrigan lane. The townland covers 228 statute acres including eleven acres of water. The sub-divisions of the townland are Sandville and Sandybrook.

History

The earliest surviving spelling of the townland name is in a printed list of Cavan townlands dated 1790 where it is spelled Aughiogher. Ambrose Leet's 1814 Directory spells the name as Augavoher with the resident being Mr. Patterson. Centuries before that the townland formed part of the Black Pig's Dyke in pre-Christian times.

Aghavoher formed part of the termon lands belonging to Tomregan Roman Catholic Church which were granted to the Church of Ireland Bishop of Kilmore in 1610 as part of the Plantation of Ulster. By a lease dated 6 April 1612 the said bishop granted the lands to Sir Oliver Lambart of Kilbeggan, County Westmeath and Sir Garret Moore, 1st Viscount Moore of Mellifont, County Louth. On 17 July 1639 the bishop re-granted the lands to Charles Lambart, 1st Earl of Cavan.

The Tithe Applotment Books for 1827 list the following tithepayers in the townland: Profet, McKiernan, Stevens, Lee, Murrey, Berry, Patterson.

A deed dated 23 February 1835 now in the Cavan Archives Service (ref P017/0043) is described as:

The Ordnance Survey Name Books for 1836 give the following description of the townland: 

The Aghavoher Valuation Office Field books are available for December 1838.

Griffith's Valuation of 1857 lists the landlords of the townland as Jones and Moore and the tenants as Berry, Winslow and Kellett.

Census

In the 1901 census of Ireland, there are six families listed in the townland.

In the 1911 census of Ireland, there are five families listed in the townland.

Antiquities

 A Bronze-Age ring-barrow on the border with Clifton; 
 A medieval crannóg in Aghavoher Lough; 
 Sandville House erected c.1850;

References

Townlands of County Cavan